The 60th Filipino Academy of Movie Arts and Sciences Awards Night was held on September 24, 2012 at Fiesta Pavilion in Manila Hotel. Angelo "Eloy" Padua, president of Manila Hotel, hosted the event. This edition of FAMAS Awards was produced by Angel Calzo and directed by Leonardo Q. Belen.

Manila Kingpin: The Asiong Salonga Story, produced by Leonard Villalon and Maylyn Villalon-Enriquez, is the recipient of this edition's FAMAS Award for Best Picture.

Awards

Major Awards
Winners are listed first and highlighted with boldface.

{| class=wikitable
|-
! style="background:#EEDD82; width:50%" | Best Picture
! style="background:#EEDD82; width:50%" | Best Director
|-
| valign="top" |
 Manila Kingpin: The Asiong Salonga Story — Leonard Villalon 
 A Mother's Story — Olivia de Jesus, John D. Lazatin, Kerwin Du
 Ang Panday 2 — Marlon Bautista, Annette Gozon-Abrogar	
 In the Name of Love — Marizel Samson-Martinez
 The Road — Annette Gozon-Abrogar
 Segunda Mano — Charo Santos-Concio, Malou Santos, Dingdong Dantes, Kris Aquino, Edward Mangahas
| valign="top" |
 Tikoy Aguiluz — Manila Kingpin: The Asiong Salonga Story
 Yam Laranas — The Road
 Ruel S. Bayani — No Other Woman
 John D. Lazatin — A Mother's Story
 Olivia M. Lamasan — In the Name of Love
 Mac Alejandre — Ang Panday 2
 Joyce Bernal — Segunda Mano 
|-
! style="background:#EEDD82; width:50%" | Best Actor
! style="background:#EEDD82; width:50%" | Best Actress
|-
| valign="top" |
 Jeorge Estregan — Manila Kingpin: The Asiong Salonga Story
 Ramon 'Bong' Revilla Jr. — Ang Panday 2
 Aga Muhlach — In the Name of Love
 Noni Buencamino — A Mother's Story
 Derek Ramsay — No Other Woman
 Dingdong Dantes — Segunda Mano
 TJ Trinidad — The Road
| valign="top" |
 Anne Curtis — No Other Woman
 Marian Rivera — Ang Panday 2
 Pokwang — A Mother's Story
 Kris Aquino — Segunda Mano
 Rhian Ramos — The Road
 Carla Abellana — Manila Kingpin: The Asiong Salonga Story
 Angel Locsin — In the Name of Love
 Cristine Reyes — No Other Woman
|-
! style="background:#EEDD82; width:50%" | Best Supporting Actor
! style="background:#EEDD82; width:50%" | Best Supporting Actress
|-
| valign="top" |
 Baron Geisler — Manila Kingpin: The Asiong Salonga Story
 Rayver Cruz — A Mother's Story
 Jake Cuenca — In the Name of Love
 Phillip Salvador — Ang Panday 2
 Tirso Cruz III — No Other Woman
 Marvin Agustin — The Road
 Jhong Hilario — Segunda Mano
| valign="top" |
 Angelica Panganiban — Segunda Mano
 Carmi Martin — In the Name of Love
 Daria Ramirez — A Mother's Story
 Iza Calzado — Ang Panday 2
 Carmi Martin — No Other Woman
 Valerie Concepcion — Manila Kingpin: The Asiong Salonga Story
 Carmina Villaroel — The Road
|-
! style="background:#EEDD82; width:50%" | Best Child Actor
! style="background:#EEDD82; width:50%" | Best Child Actress
|-
| valign="top" |
 Robert Villar — Ang Panday 2
 Renz Valerio — The Road
| valign="top" |
 Xyriel Manabat — A Mother's Story
 Sofia Millares — Segunda Mano
|- 
! style="background:#EEDD82; width:50%" | Best Screenplay
! style="background:#EEDD82; width:50%" | Best Cinematography
|-
| valign="top" |
 Roy Iglesias, Rey Ventura — Manila Kingpin: The Asiong Salonga Story
 Olivia M. Lamasan, Enrico Santos — In the Name of Love
 Yam Laranas, Aloy Adlawan — The Road
 Senedy Que — A Mother's Story
 R.J. Nuevas — Ang Panday 2
 Joel Mercado — Segunda Mano
 Ricardo Fernando III, Kriz G. Gazmen — No Other Woman
| valign="top" |
 Carlo Mendoza — Manila Kingpin: The Asiong Salonga Story
 Daniel Uy — Ang Panday 2
 Yam Laranas — The Road
 Charlie Peralta — No Other Woman
 Shayne Sarte — A Mother's Story
 Hermann Claravall — In the Name of Love
 Charlie Peralta — Segunda Mano 
|-
! style="background:#EEDD82; width:50%" | Best Art Direction
! style="background:#EEDD82; width:50%" | Best Sound
|-
| valign="top" |
 Elmer Gamila, Ritchie Besas — Ang Panday 2
 Melchor Defensor — The Road
 Shari Marie Terese E. Montiague — In the Name of Love
 Nesty Ramirez — A Mother's Story
 Nancy Arcega — No Other Woman
 Nancy Arcega — Segunda Mano
| valign="top" |
  Ariel Serafin, Ditoy Aguila, Warren Santiago, Lucy Quinto — Ang Panday 2
 Marlon Ongleo, Aenid Pajo — A Mother's Story
 Aurel Claro Bilbao — No Other Woman
 Alex Tomboc, Lamberto Casas Jr., Addiss Tabong — The Road
 Aurel Claro Bilbao — Segunda Mano
 Aurel Claro Bilbao — In the Name of Love
|-
! style="background:#EEDD82; width:50%" | Best Editing
! style="background:#EEDD82; width:50%" | Best Special Effects
|-
| valign="top" |
 Jason Cahapay, Ryan Orduña, Mirana Medina-Bhunjun — Manila Kingpin: The Asiong Salonga Story
 Mae Carzon, Yam Laranas — The Road
 Vito Cajili — No Other Woman
 Marya Ignacio — In the Name of Love
 Joyce Bernal, Marya Ignacio — Segunda Mano
 Mitos R. Briones — A Mother's Story
 Chrisel Galeno-Desuasido — Ang Panday 2
| valign="top" |
 Charles Albert Alabado, Raymund Almaran — Ang Panday 2
 Erick Torrente — Manila Kingpin: The Asiong Salonga Story
 Erick Torrente — Segunda Mano
 Jessie Abiva, Carlo Abello, Ryan Abugan — The Road
 Erick Torrente — In the Name of Love 
|-
! style="background:#EEDD82; width:50%" | Best Visual Effects
! style="background:#EEDD82; width:50%" | Best Story
|-
| valign="top" |
  Serjohn Bato, Kuckoy dela Cruz, Veder Bato — Ang Panday 2
 Earl Bontuyan, Liza Ledesma, Dodge Ledesma — Segunda Mano
 Nathaniel Robite, Joseph Ramos, Ryan Jose Ticsay — The Road
 Fiona Marie Borres — In the Name of Love 
 Rommel Pambid, Matt Queblatin, Richard Francia — A Mother's Story
 Arturo Jarlego — No Other Woman
 Erick Torrente — Manila Kingpin: The Asiong Salonga Story
| valign="top" |
 Carlo J. Caparas, R.J. Nuevas — Ang Panday 2
 Kriz G. Gazmen, Ricardo Fernando III, Keiko Aquino — No Other Woman
 Enrico Santos — In the Name of Love 
 Roy Iglesias, Rey Ventura — Manila Kingpin: The Asiong Salonga Story
 Joel Mercado — Segunda Mano
 Senedy Que — A Mother's Story
 Yam Laranas — The Road
|-
! style="background:#EEDD82; width:50%" | Best Theme Song
! style="background:#EEDD82; width:50%" | Best Musical Score
|-
| valign="top" |
  "Hari ng Tondo" — Manila Kingpin: The Asiong Salonga Story (Gloc 9  ft. Denise)
 "Sakaling Malimutan Ka" — A Mother's Story (Carol Banawa)
 "Naaalala Ka" — In the Name of Love (Jericho Rosales)
 "Panday" — Ang Panday 2 (Pupil)
 "Now That You're Gone" — No Other Woman (Juris Fernandez)
| valign="top" |
  Jessie Lasaten — Manila Kingpin: The Asiong Salonga Story
 Raul Mitra — No Other Woman 
 Fred Ferraz — A Mother's Story
 Von de Guzman — Ang Panday 2
 Von de Guzman — In the Name of Love
 Johan Söderqvist — The Road
 Carmina Cuya — Segunda Mano
|}

Special AwardsGerman Moreno Youth Achievement AwardKristofer Martin
Daniel Padilla
Enrique Gil
Derrick Monasterio
Julie Anne San Jose
Jessy Mendiola
Edgar Allan GuzmanExemplary Achievement AwardPersida V. Rueda-Acosta (In the field of justice)FAMAS Hall of FameCarlo J. CaparasHuwarang Artista sa Larangan ng Serbisyo PublikoAlfred VargasOutstanding Lady Movie ProducerMalou Santos
Lily Y. Monteverde
Annette Gozon-Abrogar
Donna VillaPublic Service AwardJorge EstreganArturo M. Padua Memorial AwardRicky LoPosthumous Award'''
Jesse Robredo

References

External links
The Unofficial Website of the Filipino Academy of Movie Arts and Sciences
FAMAS Awards 

FAMAS Award
FAM
FAM